John Malcolm Taylor (23 March 1933 – 8 September 1966) was a racing driver from England. He participated in five World Championship Formula One Grands Prix, and also participated in several non-championship Formula One races.  His Formula One debut was on 11 July 1964, at the British Grand Prix at Brands Hatch driving a one-litre, 4-cylinder, Cooper–Ford T73, where he finished fourteenth, 24 laps down, after an extended pit–stop due to a gearbox problem. Taylor did not compete in the Formula One World Championship in 1965, but continued to drive in non–championship races. He returned to Grand Prix racing in 1966 driving a two-litre Brabham–BRM for privateer David Bridges. His first race that season was the French Grand Prix at Reims where he scored his one championship point. There followed eighth places at both the British Grand Prix at Brands Hatch and the Dutch Grand Prix at Zandvoort.

Taylor died following a crash at the 1966 German Grand Prix, when the Brabham collided with Jacky Ickx's Matra on the first lap of the race. He emerged from the wreckage badly burned, and died from his injuries four weeks later.

Racing record

Complete Formula One World Championship results
(key)

Complete Formula One Non-Championship results
(key)

References

External links

1933 births
1966 deaths
English racing drivers
English Formula One drivers
British Formula Three Championship drivers
Racing drivers who died while racing
Sport deaths in Germany
Bob Gerard Racing Formula One drivers
Sportspeople from Leicester